La Matanza (Spanish for "The Massacre") refers to a communist-indigenous rebellion in El Salvador that took place between 22 and 25 January 1932. It was succeeded by large-scale government killings in western El Salvador, which resulted in the deaths of 10,000 to 40,000 people.

On 22 January 1932, members of the Communist Party of El Salvador (PCES) and Pipil peasants launched a rebellion against the Salvadoran military government due to widespread social unrest and the suppression of democratic political freedoms, especially after the cancellation of the results of the 1932 legislative election.

During the rebellion, the communist and indigenous rebels, led by Farabundo Martí and Feliciano Ama, respectively, captured several towns and cities across western El Salvador, killing an estimated 2,000 people and causing over USD$100,000 in property damage. The Salvadoran government, led by General Maximiliano Hernández Martínez, who assumed power following the 1931 Salvadoran coup d'état, declared martial law, and ordered the suppression of the revolt.

Most of the people who were killed during La Matanza, which has been described as an ethnocide, were Pipil peasants and non-combatants, causing the extermination of the majority of the Pipil-speaking population, which led to a near total loss of the spoken language in El Salvador. Many of the rebellion's leaders, including Martí and Ama, were executed by the military. The government's repression also forced several communist leaders to flee the country and go into exile.

Background

Social unrest 

Social unrest in El Salvador began to grow in the 1920s. El Salvador had three distinct social classes: the upper class, made up of wealthy landowners, the middle class, composed of politicians and soldiers, and the lower class, which was composed of mostly peasants and workers.

In 1920, a group of communist and socialist students, teachers, and artisans, established the Regional Federation of Salvadoran Workers (FRTS), El Salvador's first trade union to organize rural and urban workers. One of the rural leaders of the FRTS was Farabundo Martí, who, together with Miguel Mármol, founded the Communist Party of El Salvador (PCES) in 1930. Between 1928 and 1932, Martí fought alongside Augusto César Sandino in Nicaragua against the United States' occupation of the country.

Economic problems 

In the late-19th and early-20th centuries, the Salvadoran economy was heavily dependent on exporting coffee and coffee beans, which accounted for 75 to 95 percent of all of El Salvador's exports by 1929. Most of the coffee plantations, and the profits made by the plantations, were owned by the so-called "Fourteen Families." 

Due to the collapse of coffee prices worldwide as a result of the Great Depression in 1929, coffee producers were unable to cover the cost of producing coffee or pay their workers, leading to various coffee plantations failing and many workers to go unemployed. As a result of the reduced exports, national income fell 50 percent from the year prior, decreasing from USD¢40–50 per day to only USD¢20 per day.

Political situation

Meléndez–Quiñónez dynasty and the 1931 election 

On 9 February 1913, Salvadoran President Manuel Enrique Araujo died to his wounds after being attacked by three farmers with machetes in San Salvador during an assassination attempt. After Araujo's death, he was succeeded by a political dynasty; Araujo's vice president, Carlos Meléndez Ramírez, his younger brother, Jorge Meléndez Ramírez, and their brother-in-law, Alfonso Quiñónez Molina, held the presidency of El Salvador from 1913 until 1927 in the so-called "Meléndez–Quiñónez dynasty." The political dynasty ended when Quiñónez Molina chose Pío Romero Bosque as his successor, as there were no other family members who were willing to assume the presidency. 

During his term, Romero Bosque lifted restrictions on the existence of political parties in opposition to the ruling National Democratic Party (PDN). In 1931, a general election was held in the country, which is considered by historians to be the first free and fair election in Salvadoran history. The three primary candidates in the election were Alberto Gómez Zárate, the minister of national defense during Romero Bosque's presidency, Arturo Araujo, an engineer and coffee planter who was a distant relative of Manuel Enrique Araujo, and Maximiliano Hernández Martínez, a military officer. Araujo and Hernández Martínez eventually ran together on a joint ticket and defeated Gómez Zárate, although they did not attain a majority of the vote. Despite the military's support for Gómez Zárate and belief that the they would reject the result of the election, the armed forces remained loyal to the results of the election. Additionally, the Communist Party of El Salvador won several municipal elections.

Military coup and the canceled 1932 election 

During Araujo's administration, El Salvador was still struggling economically as a result of the Great Depression leading to social unrest across the country. In an attempt to improve the economy, Araujo reduced the military's budget and ordered some military officials to retire. His efforts were strongly opposed by the military, which staged a coup on 2 December 1931, deposing Araujo and establishing the Civic Directory. The military government was dissolved two days later when Hernández Martínez was declared as the country's acting president, however, his government was not recognized by the United States. The December 1931 coup began a period of forty-eight years of military rule in the country.

In the few days after the coup, the Communist Party of El Salvador was "cautiously optimistic" about the coup, writing an open letter to Hernández Martínez's government through its Estrella Roja newspaper, stating that the coup was "heroic and necessary" while also believing that his government would reimpose an exploitative capitalist system. Before Araujo was deposed, municipal and legislative elections were scheduled for 15 December 1931, but after his government was overthrown, the military rescheduled the municipal elections for 3–5 January 1932 and the legislative elections for 10–12 January 1932. 

When the communist party began to win several municipal elections in western El Salvador, the government canceled the results of all of the municipal elections. The legislative elections proceeded on 10 January, and despite early polling returns indicating a communist victory in San Salvador, a delayed official result announced that three non-communists won the three seats of the San Salvador department. Violence occurred throughout the electoral process, and at least thirty communists were killed in Ahuachapán.

Preparations for revolt

Planning and attempt for compromise 

Due to the result of the elections, communist party leaders believed that they could no longer come to power through legal means, as Hernández Martínez's government effectively canceled the elections. The Communist Party of El Salvador was led by Martí and Mármol. Other communist leaders included Mario Zapata, Alfonso Luna, Rafael Bondanza, and Ismael Hernández. Hernández, who was a member of the International Red Aid, believed that the United States would support the rebels and mistake it as a pro-Araujo counterrevolution. The communists' primary inspiration for revolution was the Bolsheviks' 1917 October Revolution.

According to Abel Cuenca, a Salvadoran communist and participant in the rebellion, the rebellion was not planned until after the municipal election results were canceled, with actual planning beginning on 9 or 10 January 1932. Conversely, according to Jorge Schlesinger, a Salvadoran writer, Martí began planning the rebellion in mid-December 1931 while in Puerto Cortés, Honduras. His claim, however, has been essentially discredited as his piece of evidence for his claim, a letter allegedly written by Martí discussing the rebellion, was dated to 16 December 1932, rather than 1931.

In a final attempt to avoid a violent rebellion, the communist party sent a political commission consisting of Zapata, Luna, Clemente Abel Estrada, Rubén Darío Fernández, and Joaquín Rivas to the National Palace to enter into negotiations with the government. The commission was not allowed to meet directly with Hernández Martínez, instead being directed to Colonel Joaquín Valdés, the minister of national defense, where the commission demanded "substantial contributions to the welfare of the peasants" in exchange for a cessation of illegal activities, threatening to revolt if the demands were not met. Reportedly, Luna told Valdés, "the peasants will win with their machetes the rights you are denying them," to which Valdés responded, "you have machetes; we have machine guns." The meeting ended with no compromise being met.

Government knowledge of the rebellion 

Just before the rebellion, Juan Pablo Wainwright was arrested in Guatemala. He was a communist party member who was rallying support from communists in Guatemala to invade El Salvador to overthrow Hernández Martínez's government, and his arrest ended the possibility of a foreign invasion force from aiding rebels in El Salvador. Additionally, on 18 January, Martí, Luna, and Zapata were arrested by the Salvadoran government, but the arrests were not made public until 20 January, and plans to attack the barracks in San Salvador were captured by the army. On 21 January, the government instructed newspapers in the country to report that a rebellion was planned to occur the following day.

Cuenca theorized that Hernández Martínez intentionally allowed the revolt to happen by preventing the opportunity for social and political reform to occur. The theory asserts that the intention of letting revolution occur was to crush it forcefully, as he believed the movement was doomed to fail, and that the suppression of the communist uprising would help him gain support and recognition from the United States.

Dr. Alejandro D. Marroquín argued that Hernández Martínez actually feared a potential attack from Araujo's Labor Party from Guatemala, rather than the communist rebellion itself. He argued that, to prevent Araujo from mobilizing the people to bring him back to power, Hernández Martínez allowed the rebellion to occur and crushed it by force, depriving Araujo of an armed movement to help bring him back to power.

Rebellion 

In the late hours of 22 January 1932, thousands of peasants in the western part of the country, armed with sticks, machetes, and "poor-quality" shotguns, rose up in rebellion against Hernández Martínez's regime. According to General José Tomás Calderón, an estimated 70,000 to 80,000 rebels were involved in the uprising.

Rebels led by  attacked telegraph offices, their primary target, in Juayúa at 11:00 p.m. and eventually took control of the city due to a lack of a military presence. The rebels attacked the home of Emilio Radaelli, a coffee merchant referred to as the "richest man in town," and assassinated him, along with his son and wife, who was also raped. Radaelli's house and two of his stores were burned, with many more stores being looted. Colonel Mateo Vaquero was also killed by the rebels and several civilians were tortured and murdered. Miguel Call, the mayor of Izalco, Rafael Castro Cármaco, a politician from Chalchuapa, and General Rafael Rivas, the military commander of Tacuba, were also killed by the rebels.

Businesses and homes were destroyed by rebels, with the total property damage inflicted being estimated at around SVC₡300,000 (approximately USD$120,000 in 1932). Much of the damage was inflicted against property owned by wealthy individuals and families. Eventually, the rebels captured the towns of Colón, Juayúa, Nahuizalco, Salcoatitán, Sonzacate, and Tacuba. Additionally, Pipil rebels led by Feliciano Ama supported the communist rebels and captured the town of Izalco on 23 January. Ama was an influential indigenous leader in Izalco, and believed that joining the rebellion would help him gain political office. Meanwhile, the majority of the Pipil rebels were sympathetic to the communists' ideals, and believed that they possessed a "secret weapon or magic" which would assure victory.

Despite efforts to prevent communication with the military garrisons in Ahuachapán, Sonsonate, and Santa Ana, Izalco managed to send a telegram to Sonsonate warning the military garrison there of the rebel attacks before the telegraph office was destroyed. The warning was received by the military garrison in Sonsonate, and in response, Colonel Ernesto Bará sent an expeditionary force under the command of Major Mariano Molina to crush the rebellion on 23 January. Molina's soldiers first clashed with the rebels outside of Sonzacate, and after engaging in hand-to-hand combat, the rebels retreated to the city proper. Casualties from the battle included fifty to seventy dead rebels, five dead soldiers, and half a dozen more soldiers wounded.

The Canadian warships HMCS Skeena and HMCS Vancouver were docked at the Port of Acajutla, and the ships were requested by the United Kingdom to protect any British citizens in the country. Ships from the United States arrived shortly after and the ships offered to assist the Salvadoran government in quelling the rebellion, however, Calderón turned down the offer, stating:

On 23 January, Hernández Martínez published a manifesto in the Diario Oficial, the official national newspaper of El Salvador. The manifesto read:

Quickly after the uprising in 24 January 1932, the government declared martial law and mobilized the military to crush the rebellion by force. Soldiers under the command of Colonel Marcelino Galdámez marched into the departments of Sonsonate and Ahuachapán and captured Izalco that same day. Nahuizalco, Salcoatitán, Juayúa were all captured the next day, and the rebellion was fully crushed by the afternoon of 25 January 1932.

Subsequent government killings 

On 25 January 1932, reinforcements under Calderón arrived in Sonsonate and began reprisals against peasants, especially against ethnic Pipils, in western El Salvador, indiscriminately killing thousands of civilians in the process. In several towns, the entire male population was gathered in the town's center and killed by machine gun fire. The killings persisted for two weeks until February 1932 when the government decided that the region had been sufficiently "pacified".

René Padilla Velasco, Martí's lawyer during his show trial, argued that Hernández Martínez forced Martí to launch the rebellion as a final "desperate" effort to prevent him from consolidating dictatorial control of the country. Martí, Luna, and Zapata were executed by a firing squad on 1 February 1932. Ama and Sánchez were captured by the army in Izalco on 25 January 1932; Sánchez was executed by a firing squad that same day, while Ama was lynched in a plaza in the city on 28 January 1932. Many refugees attempted to flee the country to Guatemala to escape the government's repression, however, Guatemalan President Jorge Ubico closed the border and handed over those who tried to flee back to the Salvadoran Army.

On 11 July 1932, the Legislative Assembly passed Directive 121 which officially declared an end to the rebellion. It also granted unconditional amnesty to anyone who committed crimes of any nature to "restore order, repress, persecute, punish and capture those accused of the crime of rebellion of this year".

Aftermath

Death toll 

Estimates of the exact death toll of the rebellion and subsequent government killings vary greatly; the figures most commonly estimated are between 10,000 and 40,000 dead. According to a Sonsonate resident interviewed by journalist Joaquín Méndez, the rebels killed approximately 2,000 people. Colonel Osmín Aguirre y Salinas, the chief of the National Police, stated that no more than 6,000 to 7,000 people were "executed". According to John Beverly, around 30,000 people, or four percent of the population, were killed by the government. As a result of the large scale of the killings, the event has since been referred to as La Matanza (Spanish for "The Massacre").

Political effects 

Following the mass killings, Hernández Martínez solidified his rule when the legislature confirmed his presidency in 1932. He also sought to legitimize his rule via presidential elections in 1935, 1939, and 1944, in which he was the only candidate. He exercised control of the country through force via the army and through friendly relations with the country's landowners and elites. Hernández Martínez was the country's longest serving president, serving from 1931 to 1944 when he resigned following an attempted coup and a series of mass protests against his government.

Hernández Martínez's government was not recognized by the United States after it came to power in 1931 due to the 1923 Central American Treaty of Peace and Amity which mandates its signatories shall not recognize any government which came to power via a coup d'état. Mauricio de la Selva, a Salvadoran poet and communist writer, theorized that Hernández Martínez crushed the rebellion with such violence as to appear to the United States as a "champion of anti-communism". The United States did eventually recognize Hernández Martínez's regime on 26 January 1934, not because of his government's anti-communist ideology, but because the United States perceived his government as bringing stability to the country.

Most of the surviving leaders of the Communist Party of El Salvador fled the country, primarily to Honduras and Costa Rica. The communist party itself was not banned, and it remained active in El Salvador throughout Hernández Martínez's presidency. The party even supported the mass protests which led to Hernández Martínez's resignation in 1944. In 1980, various left-wing militia groups of the Salvadoran Civil War joined forces and formed the Farabundo Martí National Liberation Front (FMLN), named after Martí. The FMLN continues to exist as one of El Salvador's major political parties.

Effect on indigenous communities 

Some scholars label the mass killings of Pipil as an ethnocide, since the army used indigenous appearance, dress, and language to help designate who should be targeted. As a result, in the decades that followed, Salvadoran indigenous peoples increasingly abandoned their native dress and traditional languages for fear of further reprisals. The events brought about the extermination of the majority of the Pipil-speaking population, which led to a near total loss of the spoken language in El Salvador. Many of the indigenous people who did not participate in the uprising stated that they did not understand the motivation of the government's persecution.

Over the years since La Matanza, the recorded population willing to self-identify as indigenous has fallen to about 10 percent in the 21st century. In the decade following the uprising, military presence in the area was persistent with the objective of keeping the peasants under control so that the events did not recur. After the dictatorship of Hernández Martínez, the method of preventing peasant discontent changed from repression to social reforms which benefitted them.

Commemoration 

In the town of Izalco, the uprising is commemorated annually on 22 January. Media coverage is moderate, but the commemoration is supported by municipal authorities who pay tribute to all who were killed during the event. Speakers include people who lived through the event, and relatives of Ama.

In 2010, President Mauricio Funes apologized to the indigenous communities of El Salvador for the brutal acts of persecution and extermination carried out by previous governments. In a statement made during the inauguration of the First Congress of Indigenous Peoples, he stated, "In this context and this spirit, my government wishes to be the first government to, on behalf of the State of El Salvador, of the people of El Salvador, and of the families of El Salvador, make an act of contrition and apologize to the indigenous communities for the persecution and extermination of which they were victims during so many years".

The Jeffrey Gould directed 2002 film 1932: Scars of Memory describes the events of the uprising and subsequent massacre.

See also 

 Anti-communist mass killings
 Guatemalan genocide
 History of El Salvador
 List of massacres in El Salvador
 List of peasant revolts

Notes

References

Citations

Bibliography

Further reading

External links 

 

1932 in El Salvador
Conflicts in 1932
Mass murder in 1932
January 1932 events
20th-century rebellions
Communist rebellions
Peasant revolts
Wars involving El Salvador
Pipil
Anti-indigenous racism in North America
Genocide of indigenous peoples of North America
Racism in North America
History of El Salvador
Political history of El Salvador
Human rights abuses in El Salvador
Massacres in El Salvador
Anti-communist terrorism
Ahuachapán Department
La Libertad Department (El Salvador)
Santa Ana Department
Sonsonate Department